CKCR-FM is a Canadian radio station in Revelstoke, British Columbia. The station operates at 106.1 FM. CKCR is owned by Bell Media and airs an adult hits format under the on-air brand Bounce 106.1.

History
In 1965, Hall-Gray Broadcasting Co. Ltd. (Bob Hall and Walter Gray) launched CKCR Revelstoke on the AM dial at 1340 kHz. CKCR was a re-broadcaster of CKXR in Salmon Arm.

In 1974, CKCR was given approval to start broadcasting local content of its own in addition to content received from CKXR. That same year CKCR set up a re-broadcaster of its own in Golden, CKGR.

Over the years, the station went through different ownerships. In October 2007, the assets of Standard Radio (including CKCR) were purchased by Astral Media. Astral's assets were acquired by the station's current owner, Bell Media, in September 2013.

CKCR in Revelstoke has applied to convert to the FM band which received Canadian Radio-television and Telecommunications Commission (CRTC) approval on March 3, 2009. CKCR now broadcasts at 106.1 FM with 800 watts.

As part of a mass format reorganization by Bell Media, on May 18, 2021, CKCR flipped to adult hits, and adopted the Bounce branding.

See also
CKXR-FM

References

External links
Bounce 106.1
CKCR-FM history - Canadian Communication Foundation
 

Kcr
Kcr
Revelstoke, British Columbia
Radio stations established in 2007
2007 establishments in British Columbia